The Kaw Mountain is a 337 metres high mountain in the commune of Roura in French Guiana, France. It is a narrow tepui with a laterite top.

Overview
Kaw Mountain is covered in rainforest and is part of the northern range of the Guiana Shield. The mountain is an obstacle to the trade winds leading to a very high humidity resulting in an abundance of plant- and animal life. The northern streams of the mountain flow into the Angélique Creek, the southern streams feed the Kaw and Mahury River.

The mountain is located near the Kaw-Roura Marshland Nature Reserve. On 12 February 2010, the General Council of French Guiana voted to protect the mountain and surrounding area as the Trésor Regional Nature Reserve.

References

Mountains of French Guiana
Roura